The Golden Screw was an Off-Off-Broadway folk rock musical written and performed by Tom Sankey which premiered at the Theatre Genesis in September 1966. It ran again from January 30, 1967 to March 5, 1967 at the Provincetown Playhouse in Greenwich Village. The show's cast album was the first rock theatrical recording of its kind. The play follows a Bob Dylanesque singer figure from folk music roots to commercialization. A subsequent production was mounted at Toronto's Global Village Theatre in 1972. Directed by Sankey, the cast included Elan Ross Gibson, Francois Regis-Klanfer and Yank Azman with music by Larry Wells (piano) and Fergus Hambleton, (guitar.)

Play
The play was directed by David Eliscu, produced by Paul Stoudt, and the cast included: Tom Sankey, Janet Day, Patrick Sullivan and Murray Paskin. The musicians were Tom Sankey (autoharp), Jack Hopper (guitar) and members of The Inner Sanctum: Kevin Michael (lead guitar), Gerry Michael (drums), Vince Taggart (rhythm guitar). The script was published as The Golden Screw, Or That's Your Thing, Baby (1968).

Track listing 
 Bad Girl
 New Evaline
 You Won't Say No
 The Beautiful People
 I Heard My Mother Crying
 I Can't Make It Anymore
 Jesus Come Down
 2000 Miles
 Trip Tick Talking Blues
 Can I Touch You
 That's Your Thing, Baby
 I Can't Remember
 Bottom End of Bleecher Street
 Flippin' Out - Little White Dog

See also
Hair (musical)

References

1966 musicals
1967 albums